Jean Blanchet may refer to:

 Jean Blanchet (Quebec politician) (1843–1908), Conservative leader of the Opposition in the Legislative Assembly of Quebec
 Jean Blanchet (physician) (1795–1857), physician and political figure in Canada East.
 Jean Blanchet (watchmaker) (died 1852), Swiss watchmaker
 Jean-Baptiste Blanchet (1842–1904), Canadian politician
 Jean Blanchet (aircraft constructor), see List of aircraft (Bf–Bo)